Jamie Drummond (born 9 December 1999) is a Scottish rugby union player. He plays as a Hooker for Glasgow Warriors and Ayrshire Bulls. He previously played for London Scottish, Marr and Cumnock.

Rugby Union career

Amateur career

He originally played for Cumnock RFC.

He joined Marr RFC in 2018.

Professional career

He was given a place in the Scottish Rugby Academy for the 2021–22 season and assigned to Glasgow Warriors.

He was also assigned to Ayrshire Bulls and played for them in the Super 6.

He played for Ayrshire Bulls against Glasgow Warriors in the 2 September 2022 match at Inverness. It was a tight match but Warriors edged the victory 22 - 17.

He was loaned out to London Scottish in November 2022. While with London Scottish, he also trained with Harlequins.

He made his competitive debut for the Exiles in the RFU Championship match against Doncaster Knights on 10 December 2022.

He returned to join the Warriors squad on 12 December 2022, ahead of their European Challenge Cup match against USA Perpignan.

International career

He has played for Scotland U16, Scotland U18 and Scotland U20.

Farming career

Drummond works on the family farm.

References

1999 births
Living people
Rugby union hookers
Glasgow Warriors players
Ayr RFC players
London Scottish F.C. players
Cumnock RFC players
Marr RFC players